The ocellated angelshark (Squatina tergocellatoides) is an angelshark of the family Squatinidae found only from the Taiwan Straits in the western Pacific between latitudes 28 and 22°N and in northern Malaysia.   Its length is up to 63 cm.

Reproduction is ovoviviparous.

References

 
 Compagno, Dando, & Fowler, Sharks of the World, Princeton University Press, New Jersey 2005 
  Walsh, JH and DA Ebert.  2007.  A review of the systematics of western North Pacific angel sharks, genus Squatina, with redescriptions of Squatina formosa, S. japonica, and S. nebulosa (Chondrichthyes: Squatiniformes, Squatinidae).  Zootaxa 1551: 31-47.
  Yano, K., A Ali, AC Gambang, IA Hamid, SA Razak, and A Zainal.  2005. Sharks and rays of Malaysia and Brunei Darussalam, Marine Fishery Resources Development and Management Department, Southeast Asian Fisheries Development Center, Kuala Terengganu, Malaysia, 591pp.

ocellated angelshark
Taiwan Strait
Fish of Taiwan
ocellated angelshark